Football at the 2017 Islamic Solidarity Games was held in Azerbaijan from 8 to 21 May 2017.

Participating teams
Eight participated teams. 

 
  – Host

Venues

Squads

Group stage

Group A

Group B

Knockout stage

Semifinals

Bronze medal match

Gold medal match

Final ranking

Goalscorers
3 goals

 Oday Dabbagh

2 goals

 Farid El Melali
 Ahmed Gagaâ
 Mahir Madatov
 Frantz Pangop Tchidjui
 Muhsen Al-Ghassani
 Salaah Al-Yahyaei
 Marwan Awlad Wadi
 Hakkı Can Aksu
 Melih Okutan

1 goal

 Abderrahim Hamra
 Tayeb Meziani
 Elshan Abdullayev
 Ruslan Abışov
 Magsad Isayev
 Aghabala Ramazanov
 Macky Bagnack
 Denis Yvan Nkolo Ossingane
 Chouaib El Maftoul
 Hamza Goudali
 Ahmed Al-Matroushi
 Islam Batran
 Mohammed Maraaba
 Taylan Antalyali
 Onur Eriş
 Oğuzhan Kayar

External links 
Results

References

2017
2017 Islamic Solidarity Games
2017 in association football
International association football competitions hosted by Azerbaijan